Events from the year 1915 in Taiwan, Empire of Japan.

Incumbents

Central government of Japan
 Prime Minister: Ōkuma Shigenobu

Taiwan
 Governor-General – Sakuma Samata, Andō Teibi

Events

January
 26 January – The opening of Ruisui Station in Karenkō Prefecture.

October
 28 October – The opening of Kagi Shrine in Tainan Prefecture.

Births
 6 November – Chung Li-ho, novelist

References

 
Years of the 20th century in Taiwan